The KAB-250 is a family of aerial bombs developed in the 2000s. It comes in two forms, the KAB-250LG-E laser-guided bomb and KAB-250S-E satellite-guided bomb. It is being introduced into service with the post-Soviet Russian Air Force since 2020. KAB stands for "Корректируемая Авиационная Бомба" which means "Managed (corrected) aircraft bomb" and refers to high-precision weapons.

The technology of KAB-250 is also used for the larger KAB-500L.

It has a noticeable, egg-shaped form and has been integrated on and dropped by Sukhoi Su-34 on Islamic State of Iraq and the Levant  targets from 5000m altitudes.

See also 
KhAB-250

References 

Aerial bombs of Russia
Guided bombs